Space Battle is a play-by-mail game that was published by Flying Buffalo beginning in 1980.

Gameplay
Space Battle was a game between two teams of ten players in which one is the commander, with a base ship and three battleships, and the game is won when the opponent's base ship is destroyed. The game lacked economic and exploring aspects.

Reception
Sam Moorer reviewed Space Battle in The Space Gamer No. 50. Moorer commented that "Space Battle is a disappointment to Flying Buffalo's customers, who enjoyed their classic games. This one lacks the balance and fascination of StarWeb or Battle Plan.  It might be interesting to a wargaming club.  They could get together to discuss strategy and tactics, coordinating their movement.  But the average PBMer won't find the trip worth the fare."

A reviewer in a 1983 issue of PBM Universal, suggested it needed more work and "largely fail[ed] to generate or sustain interest".

See also
 List of play-by-mail games

References

Flying Buffalo games
Play-by-mail games